Daš Radio or Radio Daš is a Bosnian local commercial radio station, broadcasting from Bijeljina, Bosnia and Herzegovina. This radio station broadcasts a variety of programs such as folk music, and local news.

Daš Radio was founded in 1995, and the program is mainly produced in Serbian.  Radio station is available in the city of Bijeljina as well as in nearby municipalities in Semberija and Tuzla Canton area.

The owner of the local radio station is the company M.B. KOMPANI d.o.o. Bijeljina, which also operates Daš Extra Radio radio station.

Estimated number of listeners of Daš Radio is around 144.967.

Frequencies
 Bijeljina 
 Bijeljina 
 Bijeljina

See also 
 List of radio stations in Bosnia and Herzegovina
 Daš Extra Radio
 BN Radio
 Bobar Radio
 Bobar Radio - Studio B2
 RSG Radio

References

External links 
 www.radiodas.net
 www.dasextra.ba
 www.radiostanica.ba
 www.fmscan.org
 Communications Regulatory Agency of Bosnia and Herzegovina

Bijeljina
Radio stations established in 1995
Bijeljina
Mass media in Bijeljina